William Gross, William Gros or Bill Gross may refer to:

William Hickley Gross (1837–1898), American member of the Congregation of the Most Holy Redeemer, prelate of the Roman Catholic Church
William Gross (murderer) (1796–1823), last person publicly executed in Philadelphia
William le Gros, Earl of York (died 1179), the Count of Aumale (Earl of Albemarle), Earl of York, and Lord of Holderness
William Gros (born 1992), French football striker
William G. Gross (born 1964), American police officer, former commissioner of the Boston Police Department
Bill H. Gross (born 1944), American investor, fund manager, and philanthropist who co-founded Pacific Investment Management Company
Bill T. Gross (born 1958), American businessman, founder of Idealab, GNP Audio Video and eSolar

See also
 William Grossart (1896–?), World War I flying ace
 Gross (surname)